Allen Hiram Curtiss (1845–1907) was a noted botanist in the United States. He may have been the first professional botanist to reside in Florida. His work included the discovery of fern species at the Pineola Grotto. He collected many specimens and was an author of botanical books. The Florida Agricultural Experiment Station (established in 1888 as a division of the Florida College of Agriculture at Lake City), employed Curtiss for a brief tenure and several collections at the University of Florida Herbarium are named for him. Several species are named for him including Calamagrostis curtissii and Polygala curtissii. His mother, Floretta Allen Curtiss was a keen phycologist, whose biographical sketch Allen H. Curtiss published in 1899.

References

19th-century American botanists
Botanists active in North America
1845 births
1907 deaths
Scientists from Florida